Prospect Creek, an urban watercourse of the Georges River catchment, is located in the western and Canterbury-Bankstown regions of Sydney, in New South Wales, Australia.

As Prospect Reservoir forms a part of the Sydney metropolitan water supply, the flow of the creek is regulated in accordance with the operational requirements of Sydney Water.

Course and features
Prospect Creek rises below Prospect Reservoir, north of Bulls Hill in Prospect, within the Blacktown local government area, and flows generally southeast by east, through the Holroyd, Fairfield, Liverpool and Bankstown local government areas, before reaching its confluence with the Georges River, at Georges Hall, spilling into Dhurawal Bay in the Chipping Norton Lakes.

Restrictions
Most forms of fishing are permitted in Prospect Creek, in both the tidal (lower) and freshwater (upper) catchments with fishing subject to bag and size limit regulations. Bull sharks can be found in the creek as the Georges River is tidal up to the Liverpool Weir, and Prospect Creek connects below that point. As such, swimming is not recommended.

Recreation
 
The creek winds through a number of parks and reserves, with the most prominent ones being, Gipps Road Sporting Complex, Rosford Street Reserve and the contiguous Long Street Park in Smithfield, Fairfield Park Precinct and Cawarra Park in Fairfield, Fairfield Road Park in Yennora, Makepeace Oval in Fairfield, Carrawood Park in Carramar, Mirambeena Regional Park in Lansdowne, and Henry Lawson Reserve in Georges Hall, going from northwest to southeast. It also flows on the western fringes of Fairfield High School and just north of Bland Oak, a historical tree.

There are walkways or cycling paths that parallel the creek. The longest, continuous walking path that runs alongside creek starts from Widmere Road, adjacent to the Liverpool–Parramatta T-way, in the northern periphery of Wetherill Park, and ends at Fairfield Road Park in Yennora, opposite of Yennora Fire Station. The walkabouts are within the surroundings of the Australian bushland, which include native trees such as eucalyptus.

River status

In 2020 a proposal was submitted to upgrade a 6 kilometre (4 mi) stretch of Prospect Creek river status. In September 2020, this proposal went before the Geographical Names Board of NSW (GNB) after Community Advocate Lachlan Hyde with the support of local state MPs pushed the New South Wales Government on the matter. This section would then be named Lennox River to honour Scottish-Australian stonemason David Lennox who designed and oversaw the construction of the Lansdowne Bridge which crosses this waterway.

References

External links
 

Creeks and canals of Sydney
Hume Highway
Georges River